Kamaraj College of Engineering and Technology (KCET) is a college in Madurai District established in the year 1998. KCET has been granted Autonomous status by the University Grants Commission for 10 years from 2019 to 2029. It is a technical institution offering undergraduate, postgraduate and doctoral programs engineering and technology. It is promoted and supported by virudhunagar Hindu Nadars' devasthanam, Mahamai Tharappus in Virudhunagar, educational institutions of Virudhunagar and other organizations.

Departments 
The academic departments of the college are:

Biotechnology
Civil Engineering
Computer Science and Engineering
Electronics & Communication Engineering
Electrical & Electronics Engineering
Information Technology
Mechanical Engineering
Mechatronics
Artificial Intelligence and Data Science

Undergraduate courses (4 years) 
Bachelor of Technology degree in
Biotechnology,
Information Technology,
Artificial intelligence And Data science,

Bachelor of Engineering degree in

Civil Engineering,
Computer Science & Engineering,
Electronics & Communication Engineering,
Electrical & Electronics Engineering,
Mechanical Engineering,
Mechatronics Engineering

Postgraduate courses (2 years) 
Master of Technology degree in
Biotechnology

Master of Engineering degree in
Computer Science Engineering
Communication & Networking
Manufacturing engineering,
Power Systems Engineering,
Structural Engineering

Research centres 
Bio Technology
Electrical and Electronics Engineering
Mechanical Engineering
Polymer Technology
Electronics and Communication Engineering
Physics
Chemistry

Awards 
BHUMI Campus Award - 2022 for the most Eco-friendly & Socially responsible College.
Best Engineering College in South India for Industry Interface - 2022 by CEGR, New Delhi
Best institution providing good infrastructure for learning by the Cybermedia Research Group (Data Quest)

References

External links 
 

All India Council for Technical Education
Engineering colleges in Tamil Nadu
Colleges in Madurai
Engineering colleges in Madurai
Monuments and memorials to Kamaraj